Frances Davis Alda (31 May 1879 – 18 September 1952) was a New Zealand-born, Australian-raised operatic lyric soprano. She achieved fame during the first three decades of the 20th century due to her outstanding singing voice, fine technique and colourful personality, as well as her frequent onstage partnerships at the Metropolitan Opera, New York, with Enrico Caruso.

Career
Alda was born Fanny Jane Davis in Christchurch, New Zealand, on 31 May 1879 to David Davis and Leonore Simonsen.

Leonore, a promising singer from a musical family, in September 1880 divorced David and resumed her singing career. Fanny spent her early years traveling with her mother on her operatic tours. After false starts in Australasia, she took Fanny and her younger brother to San Francisco, California in 1883. Leonore Davis remarried but died of peritonitis in San Francisco on 29 December 1884, shortly after remarrying, to Herman Adler. After her mother's death, Alda was sent to live with her maternal grandparents, Martin and Fanny Simonsen, in Melbourne, Victoria, Australia.

She sang in productions of Gilbert and Sullivan in Melbourne before leaving Australia for Europe at the age of 22 in order to undertake additional study and pursue an international singing career like her future soprano rival Nellie Melba. After receiving lessons in Paris from the renowned teacher Mathilde Marchesi, who gave her her stage name, Alda made her debut at the Opéra-Comique in 1904 in Jules Massenet's Manon. She appeared at the Royal Opera House Covent Garden in 1906, and at La Scala, Milan, during the 1906-08 seasons.

In 1908, the former La Scala impresario Giulio Gatti-Casazza became director of the Metropolitan Opera. On 7 December 1908 Alda made her debut there. On 4 April 1910, Alda and Gatti-Casazza married. According to American Art News (New York, 19 March 1910), Adolfo Müller-Ury was painting Alda just before her marriage. It was in New York that Alda furthered her career, appearing to acclaim in such famous operas as Martha, Manon Lescaut, Otello, Faust, Mefistofele and La bohème. She began recording for the Victor Talking Machine Company in 1908 and several of her records became best-sellers. She created the title roles in Victor Herbert's Madeleine and Henry Hadley's Cleopatra's Night as well as Roxane in Walter Damrosch's Cyrano. She also sang regularly with Enrico Caruso.

Alda toured Australia and New Zealand in 1927, saying in an interview she loathed the former. She and Gatti-Casazza separated the following year and then divorced. In 1929, she left the Met but continued to give concerts, make radio broadcasts and appear in vaudeville. Alda's 1937 autobiography was titled Men, Women, & Tenors.

On 14 April 1941 in Charleston, South Carolina, she married Manhattan advertising executive Ray Vir Den; he was a decade younger than she.

She had an affluent retirement in Long Island, and spent much time travelling . She died of a stroke on 18 September 1952 in Venice, Italy, aged 73.

She is buried in All Saints Episcopal Church Cemetery in Great Neck, Long Island.

Notes

References

External links

 Profile of Frances Alda, "New Zealand's most famous daughter" 
 Melba versus Alda
 Madame Frances Alda. Does Not Seem to Like Australia
 Photo from the Library of Congress's George Grantham Bain Collection
 
 
  
 Frances Alda recordings at the Discography of American Historical Recordings.

1879 births
1952 deaths
Australian operatic sopranos
Victor Records artists
19th-century New Zealand people
People from Christchurch
20th-century Australian women opera singers
Singers from Melbourne
Australian people of French descent
Australian people of Danish descent
Australian emigrants to the United States
New Zealand emigrants to Australia